The Royal Entomological Society is devoted to the study of insects. Its aims are to disseminate information about insects and improving communication between entomologists.

The society was founded in 1833 as the Entomological Society of London. It had many antecedents beginning as the Society of Entomologists of London.

History
The foundation of the society began with a meeting of "gentlemen and friends of entomological science", held on 3 May 1833 in the British Museum convened by Nicholas Aylward Vigors with the presidency of John George Children. Those present were the Reverend Frederick William Hope, Cardale Babington, William Yarrell, John Edward Gray, James Francis Stephens, Thomas Horsfield, George Thomas Rudd and George Robert Gray. Letters of  Adrian Hardy Haworth, George Bennett and John Curtis were read where they expressed their regrets to be unable to attend the meeting.

They decided that a society should be created for the promotion of the science of entomology in its various branches and it should be called the Entomological Society of London. J. G. Children, F. W. Hope, J. F. Stephens, W. Yarrell and G. Rudd were elected to form a committee, with G. R. Gray as secretary. J. G. Children became the first president and William Kirby (1759–1850) was made honorary president for life. The real date of the foundation of the society was more probably on 22 May 1833, when the members met in Thatched House Tavern, on St James's Street. During this meeting, George Robert Waterhouse (1810–1888) was elected librarian and curator of  the insects and records. As of this meeting, foreign honorary members were elected: Johann Cristoph Friedrich Klug (1775–1856), Wilhem de Haan (1801–1855), Victor Audouin (1797–1841), Johann Ludwig Christian Gravenhorst (1777–1857), Christian Rudolph Wilhelm Wiedemann (1770–1840), Carl Eduard Hammerschmidt (1800–1874) and Alexandre Louis Lefèbvre de Cérisy (1798–1867). William Blandell Spence (1813–1900) received the  task of maintaining of the relations with continental entomologists.

The society started to assemble a  library, an early addition being the personal library of Adrian Hardy Haworth (1767–1833), purchased by John Obadiah Westwood (1805–1893) on behalf of the society. The insect collection also increased.

In September 1834, the society numbered 117 honorary members and 10 full members. Women were allowed membership and benefited from the same rights as the men. A publication commenced in November 1834 under the title Transactions of the Entomological Society of London.

Secretary G. R. Gray resigned in the same year then and was replaced by J. O. Westwood. Under the impulse of this last entomologist, who had many functions, the society made great strides. It was in particular attended regularly by Charles Darwin (1809–1882) on his return from the voyage on H.M.S. Beagle: he became a member of the council and vice-president in 1838. J. O. Westwood left his functions in 1848 and was replaced by Edward Doubleday (1810–1849) and William Frederick Evans. They in their turn were soon replaced. In 1849, a secretary charged to collect the minutes of the meetings was named in the person of John William Douglas (1814–1905), a position he kept until 1856. He was assisted in 1851-1852 by Henry Tibbats Stainton (1822–1892), in 1853-1854 by William Wing (1827–1855), in 1855-1856 by Edwin Shepherd who then replaced J.W. Douglas in his position. Edward Wesley Janson (1822–91), a natural history agent, publisher and entomologist was Curator of the Entomological Society collections from 1850–63 and librarian from 1863–74.

Edward Mason Janson (1847–1880) took over the post of curator from Frederick Smith (1805–1879) who then left to work in the British Museum. H. T. Stainton, who was involved more and more in the life of the society, seemed to have some problems working with E. M. Janson. He was replaced by W. Wing in 1852. In this year, the society moved from its building at 17, Old Bond Street to 12, Bedford Row. The following year, three of the four most responsible for the society were replaced: Edward Newman (1801–1876) took the place of J. O. Westwood as president, Samuel Stevens (1817–1899) took the place of W. Yarrell as  treasurer and W. Wing the place of H. T. Stainton as secretary.

In 1885 Queen Victoria granted the society its royal charter. In 1933, the society's centenary year, King George V granted it the privilege of adding the word "Royal" to its title, making it the Royal Entomological Society.

Structure and activities
The society's patron is Her Majesty The Queen and its vice-patron is The Earl of Selborne. The society is governed by its council, which is chaired by the society's president, according to a set of by-laws. The members of council, the president and the other officers are elected from the society's fellowship and membership. The aim of the Royal Entomological Society is the improvement and diffusion of entomological science. This is achieved through publications, scientific meetings, supporting and funding entomological expeditions, and public events. The society maintains an entomological library at its headquarters in St Albans, UK. and convenes over 15 special interest groups, covering a range of scientific fields within entomology.

With the support of over 60 partner organisations, the society organises National Insect Week, a biennial initiative to engage the public with the importance of insects and entomology, through hundreds of events and activities across the UK. The society also organises Insect Festivals, a biennial series of one day events in York and Bristol celebrating insects and entomology.  In 2016 the society held its first EntoSci conference, EntoSci16, to promote entomology to 14 to 18 year olds, the event is now held biennially.

In 2022 the society announced it will sponsor a garden at the 2023 RHS Chelsea Flower Show with the charity Project Giving Back, the garden will be designed by Tom Massey and will have habitats for different types of insects and a laboratory to study them.

Publications
The society publishes seven scientific journals:
 Agricultural and Forest Entomology
 Ecological Entomology
 Insect Conservation and Diversity
 Insect Molecular Biology
 Medical and Veterinary Entomology
 Physiological Entomology
 Systematic Entomology

Members and fellows receive the quarterly entomological news journal Antenna.

The society also publishes a series of handbooks on the identification of insects. The aim of these handbooks is to provide illustrated identification keys to the insects of Britain, together with concise morphological, biological and distributional information. The series also includes several Check Lists of British Insects. All books contain line drawings, with the most recent volumes including colour photographs. In recent years, new volumes in the series have been published by Field Studies Council, and benefit from association with the AIDGAP identification guides and Synopses of the British Fauna.

Fellowship
The Royal Entomological Society has an international membership and invites applications for Fellowship from those who have made a substantial contribution to entomology, through publications or other evidence of achievement. Applications are referred to a Committee of Council, who then forward a recommendation to Council. Fellows are entitled to make use of the title "Fellow of the Royal Entomological Society" and the suffix "FRES" may be regarded as an academic qualification.

Awards

As is customary, the RES gives various awards.  These include:

 RES Goodman Award
 Marsh Award for Insect Conservation
 Alfred Russel Wallace Award
 J. O. Westwood Medal
 Wigglesworth Memorial Lecture

Badge

On the foundation of the Entomological Society in 1833 William Kirby was made Honorary Life President and Stylops melittae (then known as Stylops kirbyi) was adopted as the society's symbol. The seal was first used for a letter by the society to William Kirby, which was signed by the President and 30 members in 1836 to thank him for presenting the society with a cabinet containing his entire insect collection. William Kirby was responsible for classifying the Strepsiptera as a separate order. The society's badge has remained almost unchanged since its first use.

Officers

Honorary life Presidents
 1833–1850: William Kirby
 1883–1893: John Obadiah Westwood
 1933–1943: Edward Bagnall Poulton

Presidents
The following persons have been presidents of the society:

 1833–1834: John George Children
 1835–1836: Frederick William Hope
 1837–1838: James Francis Stephens
 1839–1840: Frederick William Hope
 1841–1842: William Wilson Saunders
 1843–1844: George Newport
 1845–1846: Frederick William Hope
 1847–1848: William Spence
 1849–1850: George Robert Waterhouse
 1852–1853: John Obadiah Westwood
 1853–1854: Edward Newman
 1855–1856: John Curtis
 1856–1857: William Wilson Saunders
 1858–1859: John Edward Gray
 1860–1861: John William Douglas
 1862–1863: Frederick Smith
 1864–1865: Francis Polkinghorne Pascoe
 1866–1867: John Lubbock, 1st Baron Avebury
 1868–1869: Henry Walter Bates
 1870–1871: Alfred Russel Wallace
 1874–1875: William Wilson Saunders
 1878:      Henry Walter Bates
 1879–1880: John Lubbock, 1st Baron Avebury
 1881–1882: Henry Tibbats Stainton
 1883–1884: Joseph William Dunning
 1885–1886: Robert McLachlan
 1887–1888: David Sharp
 1889–1890: Lord Thomas de Grey Walsingham
 1891–1892: Frederick DuCane Godman
 1893–1894: Henry John Elwes
 1895–1896: Raphael Meldola
 1897–1898: Roland Trimen
 1899–1900: George Henry Verrall
 1901–1902: William Weekes Fowler
 1903–1904: Edward Bagnall Poulton
 1905–1906: Frederick Merrifield
 1907–1908: Charles Owen Waterhouse
 1909–1910: Frederick Augustus Dixey
 1911–1912: Francis David Morice
 1913–1914: George Thomas Bethune-Baker
 1915–1916: Nathaniel Charles Rothschild
 1917–1918: Charles Joseph Gahan
 1919–1920: James John Walker
 1921–1922: Lionel Walter Rothschild
 1923–1924: Edward Ernest Green
 1927–1928: James Edward Collin
 1929–1930: Karl Jordan
 1931–1932: Harry Eltringham
 1933–1934: Edward Bagnall Poulton
 1934–1935: Sheffield Airey Neave
 1936–1937: Augustus Daniel Imms
 1938–1939: John Claud Fortescue Fryer
 1940–1941: Kenneth Gloyne Blair
 1942–1943: Patrick Alfred Buxton
 1943–1944: Edward Alfred Cockayne
 1945–1946: Geoffrey Douglas Hale Carpenter
 1947–1948: Carrington Bonsor Williams
 1949–1950: Sir Vincent Brian Wigglesworth
 1951–1952: Norman Denbigh Riley
 1953–1954: Patrick Alfred Buxton
 1955–1956: Wilfrid John Hall
 1957–1958: Owain Westmacott Richards
 1959–1960: Boris Petrovitch Uvarov
 1961–1962: George Copley Varley
 1963–1964: Sir Vincent Brian Wigglesworth
 1965–1966: Eric Omar Pearson
 1967–1968: John Stodart Kennedy
 1969–1970: Howard Everest Hinton
 1971–1972: Colin Gasking Butler
 1973–1974: Anthony David Lees
 1975–1976: Donald Livingston Gunn
 1977–1978: John David Gillett
 1979–1980: Reginald Charles Rainey
 1981–1982: Helmut Fritz van Emden
 1983–1984: Sir Thomas Richard Edmund Southwood
 1985–1986: Trevor Lewis
 1987–1988: Victor Frank Eastop
 1989–1990: Jack P. Dempster
 1991–1992: Sir Cyril Astley Clarke
 1993–1994: Miriam Louisa Rothschild
 1995–1996: Richard Lane
 1997–1998: Walter M. Blaney
 1999–2000: Roger L. Blackman
 2001–2002: Michael Frederick Claridge
 2002–2004: Christopher Peter Haines
 2004–2006: Hugh David Loxdale
 2006–2008: Jim Hardie
 2008–2010: Linda M. Field
 2010–2012: Stuart Edward Reynolds
 2012–2014: Jeremy A. Thomas
 2014–2016: John A. Pickett
 2016–2018: Michael Hassell
 2018–2020: Chris D. Thomas
 2020–2022: Helen Roy
 2022-    : Jane Hill

See also
Fellows of the Royal Entomological Society (of London)
Royal Entomological Society Handbooks

References

External links

 
 Insect Week
 BHL Digitised Transactions
 Google Books Volume 1 of the Transactions
 Royal Entomological Society publications page (includes a selection of out of print handbooks available as downloads)

 
St Albans
Entomological societies
Learned societies of the United Kingdom
Organisations based in Hertfordshire
Organizations established in 1833
Organisations based in London with royal patronage
Science and technology in Hertfordshire
1833 establishments in England